"Conceptual Love" was the debut single by singer Bada Badoo and was the first official single release by any featured performer from X-Factor, UK series 7 (ITV/SYCO, 2010). Bada Badoo, real name Baddar Chowdhry gained notoriety for his initial stage performance on the X-Factor (UK) TV Series. Bada Badoo entered the competition at the Cardiff, Wales auditions and reached the latter stages of Boot camp. With a geek persona his televised performance of the Tom Jones version of ‘I Who Have Nothing’ coined a Cheryl Cole soundbyte ‘Don’t Judge a book by its cover’. The geek persona was later carried forward in to the promotion campaign for the Conceptual Love Single released by I-innovate (UK).

The original music composition for Conceptual Love was based on a song by R&B/Soul group The Wah Wah Collective called ‘Quartet Junkie’. This original recording was taken by I-innovate (UK), indie label of the Wah Wah Collective and restructured by the Greasy Geezers production unit for the Bada Badoo release.

Critical Reception
The single release date Monday, 27 September 2010 coincided with the last televised appearance of Bada Badoo on the X-Factor TV series. Saturday, 25 September (ITV/SYCO, 2010). Conceptual Love gained regional radio airplay in the UK and was supported with radio interviews at various stations including Real Radio 105-106fm (Wales) and The Martin Lowes Show 2BR Radio 99.8fm (Lancashire).

"themusiccritic.co.uk" gave the song a positive single review stating:

" Conceptual Love is a chilled slice of radio friendly R'n'B with some serious pop overtones, and a video that has its tongue firmly in its cheek, that provides the perfect vehicle for Bada's soulful and pure voice, and you know what he may just have a hit on his hands. There is a place in UK music at the moment for a truly great soul voice and if he can live up to the early promise of this single, then he will certainly have a career that lasts a lot longer than that of Leon Jackson, Shayne Ward or Steve Brookstein".

Music video
The Conceptual Love single was promoted online through comedic video skits by I-innovate (UK) emphasizing the geek character of Bada Badoo. This was later supported with an Official Music Video directed by James Ward. The video was filmed on location in a Victorian library branding Bada Badoo the ‘Geek with Soul’. The music video was produced by Najero Okenabirhie for I-innovate Communications who are the video production side of the I-innovate (UK) label.

Credits and Personnel
"Lead Vocals" — Bada Badoo
"Lyrics" — Bada Badoo
"Producer" — George Eyo, Mel Glynn, Najero Okenabirhie
"Record label" — I-innovate (UK)
"Album" — The Conceptual Love single was released on the 'Cry Baby Soul' studio album by The Wah Wah Collective.

References

External links
 
 Discog's Bada Badoo page
 The Music Critic: Bada Badoo Conceptual Love (Single) Review
 Cardiff student booted out by X Factor judges (Live Cardiff Performance) Clare Hutchinson, Wales On Sunday. 26 September 2010
 
 MTV Artists Profile: The Wah Wah Collective

2010 debut singles
2010 songs